A Yank in Korea is a 1951 American war film directed by Lew Landers and starring Lon McCallister. It was one of the first films about the Korean War.

Plot
A tough sergeant has to teach a hotshot young soldier how to be a team player.

Cast
 Lon McCallister as Andy Smith
 William 'Bill' Phillips as Sgt. Kirby 
 Brett King as Milo Pagano
 Larry Stewart as Sollie Kaplan
 William Tannen as L.t. Lewis 
 Tommy Farrell as Jinx Hamition 
 Norman Wayne as Stan Howser
 Rusty Wescoatt as Sgt. Hutton
 William Haade as Cpl. Jawolski

References

External links

Review of film at Variety

1951 films
1950s war films
American black-and-white films
American war drama films
Columbia Pictures films
Films directed by Lew Landers
Korean War films
1950s English-language films
1950s American films